Hatun Ichhuna Kunka (Quechua hatun big, ichhuna a sickle to cut off ichhu, "big sickle throat", Hispanicized spellings Atun Ichunacunca, Atún Ichunacunca) is a mountain in the La Raya mountain range in the Andes of Peru, about  high. It is located in the Cusco Region, Canas Province, Layo District, and in the Puno Region, Melgar Province, Santa Rosa District. Hatun Ichhuna Kunka lies near the La Raya pass southwest of Kunka. Huch'uy Ichhuna Kunka ("little sickle throat" or "little Ichhunakunka") and Pichaqani are the lower elevations of the ridge to the northwest.

References

Mountains of Cusco Region
Mountains of Puno Region
Mountains of Peru